Xenorhabdus hominickii  is a bacterium from the genus of Xenorhabdus which has been isolated from the nematodes Steinernema karii in Kenya and Steinernema monticolum from Korea.

References

Further reading

External links
Type strain of Xenorhabdus hominickii at BacDive -  the Bacterial Diversity Metadatabase

Bacteria described in 2006